Total Retaliation is the seventh studio album by American beatdown hardcore band Terror. It was released on September 28, 2018, by Pure Noise Records.

Track listing

Charts

References

External links
 Total Retaliation at Pure Noise Records

2018 albums
Terror (band) albums
Pure Noise Records albums
Albums produced by Will Putney